The Film Primadonna (German:Die Filmprimadonna) is a 1913 German silent film directed by Urban Gad and starring Asta Nielsen.

Cast
 Asta Nielsen as Ruth Breton 
 Paul Otto as von Zornhorst  
 Fritz Weidemann as Walter Heim, screenwriter and actor  
 Fred Immler

References

Bibliography
 Jennifer M. Kapczynski & Michael D. Richardson. A New History of German Cinema.

External links

1913 films
Films of the German Empire
Films directed by Urban Gad
German silent feature films
German black-and-white films
1910s German films